"Let There Be Love" is a dramatic ballad by the Bee Gees, written by Barry, Robin and Maurice Gibb and released as the opening track on their 1968 album Idea. In 1970 it was issued as a single in the Netherlands, peaking at no. 14 in March during a four-week chart run. In 1968 the group performed (lip-synced) the song on a European TV station, and the clip has been played on 192TV in the Netherlands.

"Let There Be Love" features on the 1973 compilation Best of Bee Gees Vol. 2.

Background
Barry Gibb recalls:

"'Let There Be Love'" was written next to St. Paul's Cathedral in a penthouse apartment that we rented when we first arrived in England. That song was written in that penthouse 'round about midnight. Me and my then-girlfriend, who is my wife now, we'd just fallen in love, and it was that type of mood I was in that night."

The 2006 deluxe remaster has a mono mix of an earlier state of the recording, with different lead vocal sung entirely by Barry and some instrumental differences and faded at 3:34.

Personnel
 Barry Gibb — vocals, guitar
 Robin Gibb — vocals, organ,
 Maurice Gibb — bass, piano, organ, mellotron, harmony vocals
 Colin Petersen — drums
 Bill Shepherd — orchestral arrangement

Cover versions
 P.P. Arnold recorded this song on 9 June 1969 same day as "Bury Me Down By the River", another track by the Bee Gees. The session was produced by Barry Gibb.
 Tom Jones covered the song and released it as the closing track on the album Tom in 1970. It was arranged by Johnnie Spence, engineered by Bill Price and produced by Peter Sullivan.

References

1968 songs
Baroque pop songs
Bee Gees songs
Songs written by Barry Gibb
Songs written by Maurice Gibb
Songs written by Robin Gibb
Song recordings produced by Robert Stigwood
Song recordings produced by Barry Gibb
Song recordings produced by Robin Gibb
Song recordings produced by Maurice Gibb
1960s ballads
Pop ballads
Song recordings produced by Peter Sullivan (record producer)